Robert Spurgeon Bloxom Sr. (April 26, 1937 – December 13, 2020) was an American politician from the Commonwealth of Virginia. He served in the Virginia House of Delegates before becoming Secretary of Agriculture and Forestry.

Bloxom was nominated to become the first agriculture secretary for Virginia by Governor of Virginia Mark Warner. When Tim Kaine succeeded Warner as governor, he retained Bloxom in the role.

His son Robert Bloxom Jr. was elected to the House of Delegates in 2014.

Bloxom died at his home in Mappsville, Virginia, on December 13, 2020, at the age of 83.

References

External links

1937 births
2020 deaths
Republican Party members of the Virginia House of Delegates
State cabinet secretaries of Virginia
University of Richmond alumni
People from Accomack County, Virginia
Politicians from Baltimore
Baptists from Virginia
20th-century American politicians
21st-century American politicians